This section of the Timeline of United States history concerns events from 1860 to 1899.

1860s

Presidency of James Buchanan

April 3, 1860 – Pony Express begins.
November 6 – 1860 United States presidential election: Abraham Lincoln elected president and Hannibal Hamlin vice president with only 39% of the vote in a four man race. 
December 18 – Crittenden Compromise fails.
December 20 – President Buchanan fires his cabinet. 
December 20 – South Carolina secedes from the Union
January 9, 1861 – Secessionist forces in South Carolina fire at the USS Star of the West, forcing it to withdraw. 
January 9 – Mississippi secedes from the Union
January 10 – Florida secedes from the Union
January 11 – Alabama secedes from the Union
January 19 – Georgia secedes from the Union
January 26 – Louisiana secedes from the Union
February 1 – Texas secedes from the Union
February 4 – Secessionist states establish the Confederate States of America
February 18 – Jefferson Davis elected Provisional President of the Confederacy
March 2 – The Corwin Amendment to enshrine slavery forever is passed by Congress. It is not ratified.

Presidency of Abraham Lincoln
1861 – Lincoln becomes the 16th President and Hamlin becomes Vice President
1861 – American Civil War begins at Fort Sumter
1861 – First Battle of Bull Run (First Battle of Manassas)
1861 – Davis unanimously elected to full term as Confederate president.
1862 – Battle of Hampton Roads (Battle of the Monitor and Merrimack; first ever naval battle between iron-sided ships)
1862 – Homestead Act
1862 – Morrill Land-Grant Colleges Act
1862 – Gen. Robert E. Lee placed in command of the Army of Northern Virginia
1862 – Second Battle of Bull Run (Second Battle of Manassas)
1862 – Battle of Antietam (Battle of Sharpsburg)
1862 – Dakota War of 1862 begins
1862–1863 – Lincoln issues Emancipation Proclamation
1863 – Battle of Gettysburg
1863 – The Siege of Vicksburg ends
1863 – New York City draft riots
1863 – Pro-Union Virginia counties become separate state of West Virginia
1863 - Lincoln announces the 10% Plan
1864 – Gen. Ulysses S. Grant put in command of all Union forces
1864 – Wade–Davis Bill
1864 – Sand Creek massacre
1864 – Nevada becomes a state
1864 – U.S. presidential election, 1864; Lincoln is reelected president and Andrew Johnson elected vice president on the "fusion" Union Party ticket.
1864 – Sherman's March to the Sea
1865 – Robert E. Lee made commander-in-chief of all Confederate forces
1865 – President Lincoln begins second term; Andrew Johnson becomes Vice President
1865 – Richmond, Virginia, the Confederate capital, captured by a corps of black Union troops
1865 – Lee surrenders to Grant at Appomattox Court House
1865 – Freedmen's Bureau
1865 - the 13th amendment adopted, setting slaves free forever.

Presidency of Andrew Johnson

April 15, 1865 – President Abraham Lincoln assassinated; Vice President Andrew Johnson becomes the 17th President
April–June 1865 – American Civil War ends as the last elements of the Confederacy surrender
1865 – Ku Klux Klan founded
1865 – Slavery abolished by the Thirteenth Amendment.
1866 – Civil Rights Act of 1866
1866 - Tennessee becomes the first Confederate state readmitted to the union
1867 – Tenure of Office Act enacted
1867 – Territory of Alaska purchased from the Russian Empire
1867 - The US Annexes the Midway Islands in the Pacific
1867 – Nebraska becomes a state
1867 - Congress passes a series of Reconstruction acts and the period of Radical Reconstruction begins
1868 – Impeachment of Andrew Johnson, acquitted by the Senate by one vote.
1868 – Fourteenth Amendment is ratified; second of Reconstruction Amendments
1868 – The Copperheads are dissolved.
1868 – Ulysses S. Grant is elected president and Schuyler Colfax Vice President of USA
1868 - Arkansas, Louisiana, Florida, North Carolina, South Carolina, and Alabama are admitted back into the union
1868 - Boss Tweed gained control of Tammany Hall

Presidency of Ulysses S. Grant
1869 – Grant becomes the 18th President and Colfax becomes Vice President
1869 – The First transcontinental railroad is completed at Promontory Summit, Utah Territory
1869 - Texas v. White upholds Radical Reconstruction and states that once Texas joins the Union, its union was indissoluble

1870s

1870 – 15th Amendment
1870 – First graduate programs (at Yale and Harvard)
1870 – Black Codes
1870 - Virginia, Mississippi, Texas, and Georgia are readmitted to the union
1871 – Great Chicago Fire
1871 – Treaty of Washington with the British Empire regarding Canada
1871 - The New York Times published evidence of Tweed’s rampant greed.
1871 - Civil Service Reform Act passes
1871 - Ku Klux Klan Act
1872 – Yellowstone National Park created
1872 – Crédit Mobilier scandal
1872 – Amnesty Act
1872 – Alabama Claims
1872 – U.S. presidential election, 1872: Ulysses S. Grant reelected president; Henry Wilson elected vice president
1872 - Victoria Claflin Woodhull, first woman presidential candidate, enters presidential race.
1873 – Panic of 1873
1873 – President Grant begins second term; Henry Wilson becomes Vice President
1873 – Virginius Affair
1873 - One of the first schools of nursing opens at Bellevue Hospital in New York
1874 – Red River Indian War
1874 - National Woman’s Christian Temperance Union formed in Cleveland
1875 – Aristides (horse) wins first Kentucky Derby
1875 – Resumption Act
1875 – Civil Rights Act of 1875
1875 – The Art Students League of New York is founded
1875 – Vice President Wilson dies
1875 - Whiskey Ring Scandal
1876 – National League of baseball founded
1876 – Centennial Exposition in Philadelphia
1876 – Munn v. Illinois establishes public regulation of utilities
1876 – Colorado becomes a state
1876 – Battle of Little Bighorn
1876 - Central Park opens in New York City
1876 – Wild Bill Hickok is killed by a shot to the back of his head by Jack McCall while playing poker in Deadwood, South Dakota. He held aces and eights, now known as the Dead man's hand.
1876 – U.S. presidential election, 1876 seemingly elects Samuel J. Tilden President and Thomas A. Hendricks vice president, but results are disputed with 20 Electoral College votes allegedly in doubt. 
1877 – The Electoral Commission awards Rutherford B. Hayes the presidency and William A. Wheeler the vice presidency in return for ending the military occupation of the South.
1877 – Great Railroad Strike of 1877

The Presidency of Rutherford B. Hayes
1877 – After only two days as president-elect, Hayes becomes the 19th President and Wheeler becomes Vice President
1877 – Reconstruction ends
1877 – Nez Perce War
1878 – Bland–Allison Act
1878 – Morgan silver dollars first minted
1879 – Thomas Edison creates first commercially viable light bulb
1879 – Knights of Labor go public

1880s

1880 – University of Southern California founded
1880 – U.S. population exceeds 50 million
1880 – U.S. presidential election, 1880: James A. Garfield elected president and Chester A. Arthur vice president. Their popular margin is less than 2,000 votes.

Presidency of James A. Garfield
1881 – Garfield becomes the 20th President
1881 – President Garfield is shot by a deranged gunman.

Presidency of Chester A. Arthur
1881 – President Garfield dies after 99 days, Vice President Arthur becomes the 21st President
1881 – The Gunfight at the O.K. Corral in Tombstone, Arizona Territory
1881 – Clara Barton creates the American Red Cross
1881 – Tuskegee Institute founded
1881 – Billy the Kid is shot and killed by Sheriff Pat Garrett near Fort Sumner
1881 – A Century of Dishonor written by Helen Hunt Jackson
1882 – Chinese Exclusion Act
1882 – Jesse James was shot and killed by Robert and Charlie Ford
1883 - The Southern section of the second transcontinental railroad line is completed.
1883 –  Buffalo Bill's Wild West show founded. participants include: Sitting Bull, Geronimo, Calamity Jane, and Annie Oakley.
1883 – Civil Rights Cases 109 US 3 1883 legalizes doctrine of segregation
1883 – Pendleton Civil Service Reform Act
1883 – Brooklyn Bridge opens
1883 - Joseph Pulitzer buys the New York World
1884 – U.S. presidential election, 1884: Grover Cleveland elected president and Thomas A. Hendricks elected vice president
1884 – Washington Monument completed

First presidency of S.Grover Cleveland
1885 – Grover Cleveland becomes the 22nd President; Thomas A. Hendricks Vice President
1885 – Vice President Hendricks dies
1886 – Haymarket Square Riot
1886 – American Federation of Labor founded in Columbus, Ohio
1886 – Statue of Liberty (Liberty Enlightening the World) dedicated
1887 – The United States Congress creates Interstate Commerce Commission
1887 – Dawes Act
1887 – Hatch Act
1888 – Publication of Looking Backward by Edward Bellamy
1888 – National Geographic Society founded
1888 – U.S. presidential election, 1888: Benjamin Harrison elected president and Levi P. Morton vice president despite coming in second in the popular vote.

Presidency of Benjamin Harrison
1889 – Harrison becomes the 23rd President and Morton becomes Vice President
1889 – Oklahoma Land Rush (April 22, 1889)
1889 – Centennial of the Constitution celebrated.
1889 – North Dakota, South Dakota, Montana and Washington become states
1889 – Johnstown Flood in Pennsylvania
1889 – Jane Addams founds Hull House
December 6, 1889 – Former confederate president Jefferson Davis dies.
1889 - During a speech given by Benjamin Harrison, he becomes the first U.S. president in history to have a voice recording.

1890s

1890 – Sherman Antitrust Act
1890 – Jacob Riis published "How the Other Half Lives"
1890 – Sherman Silver Purchase Act
1890 – McKinley Tariff
1890 – Yosemite National Park created
1890 – Idaho and Wyoming become states
1890 – Wounded Knee Massacre
1890 – National American Woman Suffrage Association founded
1890 - Reporter Nelly Bly circles globe by train and steamship in 72 days
1891 – Baltimore crisis
1891 – James Naismith invents basketball
1891 - Hamlin Garland publishes Main-Travelled Roads
1892 – Homestead Strike
1892 – General Electric Company founded
1892 – Sierra Club founded by John Muir
1892 - Populist national convention held in Omaha
1892 – U.S. presidential election, 1892: Grover Cleveland elected president and Adlai E. Stevenson, vice president

Second presidency of S. Grover Cleveland
1893 – Grover Cleveland becomes the 24th President; Adlai E. Stevenson becomes Vice President
1893 – Panic of 1893
1893 – Sherman Silver Purchase Act repealed
1893 - Columbian Exposition opens in Chicago
1894 – Coxey's Army
1894 – Pullman Strike
1894 – Wilson–Gorman Tariff Act, including income tax
1894 – Sunset Limited service opened on the second transcontinental route by Southern Pacific Railroad
1895 – Lee Shelton shoots Billy Lyons, spawning countless ballads.
1895 – Pollock v. Farmers' Loan & Trust Co. strikes down part of Wilson-Gorman Tariff
1895 - William Randolph Hearst purchases the New York Morning Journal
1896 – Plessy v. Ferguson 163 US 537 1896 affirms the idea of "separate but equal"
1896 – William Jennings Bryan delivers his Cross of Gold speech
1896 – Gold discovered in the Yukon's Klondike
1896 – Utah becomes a state
1896 - Henry Ford builds his first automobile
1896 – U.S. presidential election, 1896: William McKinley elected president and Garret A. Hobart vice president

Presidency of William McKinley
1897 – McKinley becomes the 25th President; and Hobart becomes Vice President 

1897 – Boston subway completed
1897 – Dingley tariff
1898 – The City of Greater New York is created through the annexation of Brooklyn, Western Queens County, and Staten Island into New York City
1898 – USS Maine explodes in Havana, Cuba harbor, precipitating the Spanish–American War
1898 – De Lôme Letter
1898 – Treaty of Paris (1898) ends Spanish–American War; Philippine–American War begins
1898 – Hawaii annexed
1898 – Newlands Resolution
1898 – American Anti-Imperialist League organized
1899 – Teller Amendment
1899 – Newsboys' strike of 1899
1899 – American Samoa occupied
1899 – Open Door Notes
1899 – Vice President Hobart dies

See also
 Timeline of the American Old West
 History of the United States (1849–1865)
 History of the United States (1865–1918)

References

External links

 Library of Congress. Time Line of African American History, 1852–1880
 H-SHGAPE  discussion forum for people studying the Gilded Age and Progressive Era

1860